Yasunori is a masculine Japanese given name.

Possible writings
Yasunori can be written using many different combinations of kanji characters. Here are some examples:

安徳, "tranquil, benevolence"
安紀, "tranquil, chronicle"
安典, "tranquil, law code"
安範, "tranquil, pattern"
安憲, "tranquil, constitution"
安法, "tranquil, method"
保徳, "preserve, benevolence"
保紀, "preserve, chronicle"
保典, "preserve, law code"
保範, "preserve, pattern"
保憲, "preserve, constitution"
保法, "preserve, method"
靖徳, "peaceful, benevolence"
靖紀, "peaceful, chronicle"
靖典, "peaceful, law code"
泰徳, "peaceful, benevolence"
康規, "healthy, to scheme"
八洲乗, "8, continent, to get on"

The name can also be written in hiragana やすのり or katakana ヤスノリ.

Notable people with the name
, anime sound director
, producer of the Onegai anime
, better known as Kenzō Kotani (小谷 憲三), a swordmaker
, Japanese voice actor
, Japanese voice actor
, composer from Yamaguchi Prefecture known for his video game music
, speed skater
, Japanese composer
, better known as Sakura, a former drummer for the band L'Arc~en~Ciel
, better known as Ken Shimura, an actor and comedian
, Japanese serial killer
, J-league soccer (football) player
, Japanese rugby union player
, Japanese anime screenwriter
, Japanese volleyball player

Fictional characters
Yasunori Kato (加藤 保憲), fictional villain in Hiroshi Aramata's Teito Monogatari

Japanese masculine given names